John Givens (May 12, 1926 – December 8, 2009) was an American basketball player and coach.

Boarn and raised in McHenry in Ohio County, Kentucky, Givens played college basketball at Western Kentucky University for coach E.A. Diddle. He was drafted by the NBA's Rochester Royals in the sixth round of the 1950 draft.

Givens was a starting guard on the 1950–51 Sheboygan Red Skins of the National Professional Basketball League. The Red Skins finished with the league's best record at 29–16, after which the league dissolved. Givens was one of the league's most electric performers and finished seventh in NPBL scoring with 569 points in 44 games, a 12.9 per-game average.

Givens became the first head coach of the Kentucky Colonels during the American Basketball Association's first season in 1967–1968. Givens also became the first coach in the history of the ABA to be fired, after a 5–12 start. He was replaced as head coach of the Colonels by Gene Rhodes.

Givens later coached at Thomas Jefferson High School and Fern Creek High School, both in Jefferson County, Kentucky, before he retired.

Givens died on December 8, 2009, at his home in Louisville, Kentucky. He was survived by his widow, Eldora.

References

External links

 Remember the ABA.com
 Basketballreference.com

1926 births
2009 deaths
American men's basketball coaches
Basketball players from Louisville, Kentucky
Kentucky Colonels coaches
People from Ohio County, Kentucky
Rochester Royals draft picks
Sheboygan Red Skins players
Sportspeople from Louisville, Kentucky
Western Kentucky Hilltoppers basketball players
American men's basketball players
Basketball coaches from Kentucky